Rustum Ghazaleh also transl. from Arabic as Rostom Ghazale, Rustom Ghazalah, Rustom Ghazali; (3 May 1953 – 24 April 2015) was a Syrian military and intelligence officer.

Early life
Ghazaleh was born into a Sunni Muslim family in Qarfa village in Daraa Governorate on 3 May 1953.

Career
Ghazaleh joined the Syrian Arab Army as a first lieutenant and platoon commander of a mechanized infantry (BMP-1) unit in 1973, just in time for the Yom Kippur War but did not see frontline combat. He later trained in artillery and military intelligence in the Soviet Union. He was later an artillery spotter and commander of a mechanized battalion during the Lebanese Civil War. He was appointed by Syrian President Bashar al-Assad in December 2002 to succeed the late Ghazi Kanaan as head of Syrian military intelligence in Lebanon. He frequently traveled to the Bekaa valley where he had a residence and his headquarters in Anjar, and has been accused of involvement in the Bekaa drug trade and other smuggling ventures.

In early 2005, the killing of Rafik Hariri led to intense pressure on Syria. Ghazale's and Kanaan's foreign assets were frozen by the United States for their role in the alleged occupation of Lebanon and other suspected irregularities. Syria eventually withdrew its 15,000 man strong army. Ghazaleh relocated to Syria. However, some Lebanese and foreign observers alleged that Syria keeps interfering with Lebanese politics through parts of its intelligence apparatus left behind in the country; Syria denies the charges. Kanaan later allegedly committed suicide.

In September 2005, Ghazaleh was questioned on the Hariri assassination by United Nations investigator Detlev Mehlis. In December 2005, former Syrian vice president Abdul Halim Khaddam accused Ghazaleh of political corruption, dictatorial rule in Lebanon and of threatening Hariri prior to his death. After the withdrawal from Lebanon little was heard of him. However, at the beginning of the protests in Daraa, Ghazaleh was sent by Bashar al-Assad to assure locals of the president's good intentions. He reportedly told them: "We have released the children" – a reference to several teenagers who were arrested for writing anti-government graffiti inspired by the events in Egypt and Tunisia. In May 2011, the European Union said Ghazaleh was head of military intelligence in Damascus countryside (Rif Dimashq) governorate, which borders Daraa governorate, and was involved in the repression of dissent in the region. He is considered part of Assad's inner circle.

On 24 July 2012, Ghazaleh was appointed chief of political security. He is allegedly opposed to the prominent role played by Hezbollah and other foreign fighters (in particular Iranians) in the Syrian civil war, a stance which led to him being attacked by the bodyguards of the pro-Iranian Lt. Gen Rafiq Shahadah in early 2015.

Death
Ghazaleh was severely beaten by the bodyguards of Lt. Gen. Rafiq Shahadah over a disagreement the two had regarding Iranian involvement in the 2015 Southern Syria offensive, with news emerging two months later that Ghazaleh had died on 24 April 2015 after complications from a severe head wound which resulted in him having been clinically dead for several weeks prior. A figure close to Syrian government officials claimed the argument had been over fuel smuggling, while a Lebanese journalist suspected that Ghazaleh was "gotten rid of" due to the role he could have played in the Special Tribunal for Lebanon. Saad Hariri stated that Ghazaleh had contacted him the day before he was beaten, wanting to appear on television to announce details regarding the Special Tribunal for Lebanon, while an analyst claimed Ghazaleh had seen the end was near for the Syrian government and wanted to defect. Syrian government media failed to report Ghazaleh's death.

References

1953 births
2015 deaths
Arab Socialist Ba'ath Party – Syria Region politicians
Directors of intelligence agencies
People from Izra District
People of the Lebanese Civil War
People of the Syrian civil war
Syrian expatriates in the Soviet Union
Syrian generals
Syrian Sunni Muslims